Rangila Ratan is a 1976 Bollywood action film directed by S. Ramanathan and presented and produced by Ratan Khatri and RB Films.
It starred Rishi Kapoor, Parveen Babi and Ashok Kumar in lead roles.

Cast
 Rishi Kapoor as Kishan/Gopal  
Parveen Babi as Madhu
Ashok Kumad as Govt. Lawyer
Ajit as Laxman dada
Jeevan  
Durga khote as dadi ma
Sunder                           
 keshto mukherji as keshto
Pinchoo Kapoor as madhu's father

Soundtrack
All song penned by Lyricist Gulshan bawra music by Kalyan ji Anand ji

External links
 

1976 films
1970s Hindi-language films
1976 action films
Films scored by Kalyanji Anandji
Films directed by S. Ramanathan
Hindi-language action films